Budhwar Peth is a general term, in the Marathi language, for a locality in the Indian cities. These include cities like Pune, Solapur, Madhavnagar, Karad, Ahmednagar etc. The term Budhwar has derived from the day Wednesday in Marathi.

Neighbourhoods in Maharashtra